Guibert of Cors (died 1258) was a French knight and Baron of Mitopoli in the Principality of Achaea. Guibert was married to Margaret of Nully, daughter of the Lord of Passavas John of Nully. He was killed in 1258 in the Battle of Karydi.

References 

Barons of the Principality of Achaea
Medieval French nobility
1258 deaths
Military personnel killed in action
Year of birth unknown
13th-century French people